Artashes Enfiajyan was an Armenian politician who served as Minister of Finance of the First Republic of Armenia from 1918 to 1919 and from 1919 to 1920.

In a letter to his wife, the first prime minister of Armenia, Hovhannes Kajaznuni, appreciated Enfiajyan, a tobacco factory owner, the most of the members of the Armenian Populist Party in the cabinet, adding however that he is "difficult to manage".

References 

People of the First Republic of Armenia
Finance ministers of Armenia